The men's team sprint cross-country skiing competition in the classical technique at the 2014 Sochi Olympics took place on 19 February at Laura Biathlon & Ski Complex. The race was won by Finland's Iivo Niskanen and Sami Jauhojärvi, followed by Russia's Maxim Vylegzhanin and Nikita Kriukov second (+0.97 seconds) and Sweden's Emil Jönsson and Teodor Peterson third (+15.12 seconds). Teamed up with Hannes Dotzler, Germany's anchor Tim Tscharnke clashed with Jauhojärvi's skis in the last leg, as Jauhojärvi changed his line. The results were protested by Germany, but the protest was rejected and the results were confirmed. Yelena Välbe, president of the Russian Ski Federation, told reporters: "Finland should be disqualified but the protest has already been rejected".

In November 2017 Maxim Vylegzhanin was disqualified for doping offenses, as a result Russia lost its silver medal. On 22 December, Nikita Kryukov was disqualified as well. On 1 February 2018, their results were restored as a result of the successful appeal.

Results
The races were started at 14:05.

Semifinals

Final

References

Men's cross-country skiing at the 2014 Winter Olympics
Men's team sprint cross-country skiing at the Winter Olympics